Lunania racemosa is a species of flowering plant in the family Salicaceae. It is endemic to Jamaica.  It is threatened by habitat loss.

References

racemosa
Vulnerable plants
Endemic flora of Jamaica
Taxonomy articles created by Polbot